La Palma Airport  is an airport located in Breña Baja and Villa de Mazo,  south of the city of Santa Cruz de La Palma on La Palma in the Canary Islands. It is operated by Aeropuertos Españoles y Navegación Aérea (AENA), who operate the majority of civil airports in Spain.

The airport is served mainly by Binter Canarias and CanaryFly with island-hopping flights from Tenerife and Gran Canaria, but there are flights to the main Europe cities and charter flights from mainland Europe such as Germany, United Kingdom, Scandinavia and the Netherlands. In 2018, the airport had 1,420,277 passengers in the 22,033 operations handled. Cargo traffic totalled 565 tonnes.

New terminal

A new terminal building opened in July 2011, giving the airport an ultimate capacity of 3 million passengers per year. The new terminal has 25 check-in desks, 4 baggage carousels, and 9 boarding gates. The new terminal is farther back than the old terminal, meaning that apron space is maximised. There are still no plans to build a taxiway parallel to the runway, so aircraft still have to backtaxi on the runway, limiting capacity to 10 operations per hour. The airport also has a new control tower.

Airlines and destinations
The following airlines operate regular scheduled and charter flights at La Palma Airport:

Incidents
The 2021 Cumbre Vieja volcanic eruption on La Palma caused the airport to temporarily shut down operations.

Statistics

References

External links

Airports in the Canary Islands
La Palma
Airports established in 1970